Grégoire Maertens (born 1 January 1924) is a West-Flemish Esperantist who was a member of the Estraro (steering committee) for the UEA (Universala Esperanto-Asocio or World Esperanto Association) from 1977 until 1992. From 1980 until 1986 he was president of the UEA, and an honorary member from 1993 onwards.

Gregoire Maertens was born in Bruges, where he became active in the local Esperanto movement in Bruges as of 1946 and became a member of the BEF (Belga Esperanto-Federacio or Belgian Esperanto Federation).  He was a lecturer at the AIS (Akademio Internacia de la Sciencoj or International Academy of Science) in San Marino, where he was also treasurer from 1992 until 1995.

References

1924 births
Living people
Belgian Esperantists
People from Bruges